Other ranks (ORs) in the Royal Marines (RM), the British Army, and the Royal Air Force (RAF), along with the navies, armies, and air forces of many other Commonwealth countries and the Republic of Ireland, are those personnel who are not commissioned officers, but usually include non-commissioned officers (NCOs).  In the Royal Navy (RN), these personnel are called 'ratings' rather than 'other ranks'.  Non-commissioned member (NCM) is the equivalent term in the Canadian Armed Forces.  Colloquially, members of the other ranks are often known as 'rankers'.

The term 'other ranks' is often considered to exclude warrant officers (WO), and occasionally in some militaries also excludes NCOs.  Formally, a regiment consists of the 'officers, warrant officers, non-commissioned officers, and men', or the 'officers, warrant officers, and other ranks'.

British other ranks

Notes

See also

Royal Navy ratings rank insignia
British Army other ranks rank insignia
RAF other ranks

References

 
Military ranks of the United Kingdom